Celanese Theatre is an anthology television series which aired from October 3, 1951, to June 25, 1952, on ABC.

Concept 
The series arose from the Playwrights' Repertory Theater of Television with its focus on adapting stage plays to television.

Produced by the Celanese Corporation and the William Morris Agency, it featured plays by Maxwell Anderson, Philip Barry, Rachel Crothers, Eugene O'Neill, S. N. Behrman, Elmer Rice, John Van Druten, Sidney Howard, Paul Osborn, and Robert E. Sherwood. The program's first production was O'Neill's Ah, Wilderness!.

Schedule 
Celanese Theatre aired as a 60-minute program on Wednesdays at 10 p.m. ET. Beginning on January 9, 1952, the show aired in a 30-minute version which ran from 10 p.m. to 10:30 p.m. ET. The show alternated with Pulitzer Prize Playhouse.

For two months beginning in October, Celanese Theatre alternated with King's Crossroads, which was a "movie series".

Recognition
Celanese Theatre was nominated for Primetime Emmy awards as Outstanding Drama Series in 1952 and 1953. It won the Peabody Award in 1951, with the comment "For the first time, Celanese Theatre fused the realism and vitality of the theatre at its best with inventive camera and production techniques, revealing the limitless potentialities of television to project great drama into the American home."

Cancellation
The program ended when officials at the Celanese company concluded that it cost too much, despite positive recognition by critics and awards organizations. On August 12, 1952, Milton R. Bass wrote in The Berkshire Eagle: "It has been impossible for the network to sell the program because no other sponsor wants to pay for a program called Celanese Theatre. Any other name would mean nothing to the public and all those awards and huzzahs are absolutely down the drain."

Notable Guest Stars

Jean-Pierre Aumont
Richard Burton
Wendell Corey
Helen Craig
Melvyn Douglas
Mildred Dunnock
Ann Dvorak
Lillian Gish
Coleen Gray
June Havoc
Kim Hunter
Ruth Hussey
Jack Klugman
Veronica Lake
Karl Malden
Roddy McDowall
Burgess Meredith
Thomas Mitchell
Ralph Morgan
David Niven
Mickey Rooney
Robert Stack
Robert Sterling

See also
1951-52 United States network television schedule

References

External links

Celanese Theatre at CTVA with episode list
final episode 'On Borrowed Time' (originally aired June 25, 1952)

American Broadcasting Company original programming
1951 American television series debuts
1952 American television series endings
Black-and-white American television shows
1950s American anthology television series
Television series based on plays
Peabody Award-winning television programs